Giannis Dintsikos (born 25 June 1960) is a Greek former professional footballer who played as a forward.

Club career
Dintsikos started playing football in his hometown of Kozani at Doxa Rodiani. Five years later he joined the academies of Kastoria, where he was promoted to the men's team in 1977. He was a member of the team that won the Greek Cup in 1980, while he also scored in the final at the 5–2 against Iraklis. In the summer of 1981, Dintsikos moved to AEK Athens. On 21 October 1984 he scored a hat-trick in the imposing 7–2 at home over Pierikos. He played for 8 seasons at the club winning another Greek Cup in 1983, as well as the championship in 1989. Dintsikos was forced to retire from football at the young age of 29, due to health issues and his problematic off-field life.

International career
Dintsikos made three appearances for Greece during 1984. He made his debut on 12 September 1984, in an away friendly against East Germany, where he started the match under the guidance of Miltos Papapostolou.

He was also a member of the Olympic team that participated in the pre-Olympic tournament to qualify for the 1984 Summer Olympics in Los Angeles, where he scored in his only appearance, in the away match against Hungary.

Honours

Kastoria
Greek Cup: 1979–80

AEK Athens
Alpha Ethniki: 1988–89
Greek Cup: 1982–83

References

External links

1960 births
Living people
Greek footballers
Greece international footballers
Super League Greece players
Kastoria F.C. players
AEK Athens F.C. players
Association football forwards
People from Kozani (regional unit)
Footballers from Western Macedonia